Qez Qaleh-ye Bozorg (also Romanized as Qez Qal‘eh-ye Bozorg; also known as Qez Qal‘eh) is a village in Hesar Kharvan Rural District, Mohammadiyeh District, Alborz County, Qazvin Province, Iran. At the 2006 census, its population was 34, in 14 families.

References 

Populated places in Alborz County